The Subcommittee on Intergovernmental Affairs, ws a subcommittee within the U.S. House of Representatives Oversight and Government Reform Committee. It was dissolved after Democrats regained the House during the 116th Congress.

Members, 115th Congress

External links
 Subcommittee webpage

References

Oversight Regulatory Affairs, Stimulus Oversight And Government Spending